Michelle Robin Lewis (born ) is an American singer-songwriter who has released two solo albums. She has since worked as a songwriter for artists including Cher, Shawn Colvin, Hilary Duff, Kay Hanley and Kelly Osbourne.

Biography
Michelle Lewis was born in New York City to saxophonist Morty Lewis and Annette Sanders (née Benbasset), a session singer for radio and TV jingles. As a child, she was a jingle singer and also a regular on Sesame Street. She was raised in River Vale, New Jersey.

While attending Columbia University, Lewis began performing with emerging downtown NY bands such as Blues Traveler and Spin Doctors. After graduation, Lewis was hired by jazz label GRP Records as a production coordinator and then signed a publishing deal with BMG Music in 1994. While at BMG, she wrote singles for artists such as Amy Grant and Todd Terry. She also earned a Juno Award for Dance Recording of the Year for "Deeper Shade of Love," a song she wrote for Camille, and an ARIA for Song of the Year with Australian pop star Deni Hines.

Lewis signed with Giant Records and released her debut album, Little Leviathan, in 1998. The single "Nowhere and Everywhere" was featured on the soundtrack to the film Practical Magic.

What she is perhaps best known for recently is the music for the Disney Jr show, Doc McStuffins, which is now in its fourth season and for which she won a Peabody Award in 2015.  She also received her first Emmy nomination this past year for her work as a composer on the Nickelodeon show, Bubble Guppies.

While she continues to perform with her band, The Goods, write songs for pop radio and compose for kids’ television, Michelle's experience as a working songwriter has led her and some of her long-time collaborators, Kay Hanley, Shelly Peiken and Pam Sheyne, to found Songwriters of North America (SONA) – a Los Angeles-based organization of professional songwriters and composers who wish to advocate for upholding the value of their work in the digital future.

Discography

Solo

Film

Television

Vocals

Selected discography

References

External links
 

Living people
Place of birth missing (living people)
Year of birth missing (living people)
American singer-songwriters
Jazzhole members
Musicians from New Jersey
People from River Vale, New Jersey